There have been several Sino-Burmese wars—wars between China and Burma (Myanmar)—in history:

First Mongol invasion of Burma (1277–1287)
Second Mongol invasion of Burma (1300–1302)
Ava-Ming War (1412-1415) 
Sino-Burmese War (1582–1584)
Sino-Burmese War (1593)
Sino-Burmese War (1661–1662)
Sino-Burmese War (1765–1769)

See also
Luchuan–Pingmian campaigns (1436–1449)
Kuomintang Islamic insurgency in Burma (1950–58)
1960–61 campaign at the China–Burma border

Wars involving Myanmar
Wars involving Imperial China